Casey (pronounced CAY-see) is a city in Clark and Cumberland counties in the U.S. state of Illinois. The population was 2,404 at the 2020 census.

The Cumberland County portion of Casey is part of the Charleston–Mattoon Micropolitan Statistical Area.

Casey is the home to several Guinness World Record constructions - super-sized items in the form of outdoor sculptures—including the Wind Chime, Rocking Chair, Knitting Needles, Crochet Hook, Pitchfork, Golf Tee, Yardstick, Wooden Token, Dutch Wooden Shoes, Mailbox, Pencil and Birdcage.

Geography
Casey is located at  (39.299543, -87.990056). Most of the city lies in Clark County, although a small portion extends into Cumberland County. In the 2000 census, 2,940 of Casey's 3067 residents (99.9%) lived in Clark County and 2 (0.1%) lived in Cumberland County.

Climate

Demographics

As of the 2020 census there were 2,404 people, 1,197 households, and 745 families residing in the city. The racial makeup of the city was 96.30% White, 0.50% African American, 0.08% Native American, 0.17% Asian, 0.33% from other races, and 2.62% from two or more races. Hispanic or Latino of any race were 1.79% of the population.

There were 1,197 households, out of which 41.60% had children under the age of 18 living with them, 46.12% were married couples living together, 13.45% had a female householder with no husband present, and 37.76% were non-families. 28.49% of all households were made up of individuals, and 13.70% had someone living alone who was 65 years of age or older. The average household size was 2.61 and the average family size was 2.12.

The city's age distribution consisted of 20.6% under the age of 18, 12.9% from 18 to 24, 21.6% from 25 to 44, 23.9% from 45 to 64, and 21.0% who were 65 years of age or older. The median age was 39.6 years. For every 100 females, there were 79.5 males. For every 100 females age 18 and over, there were 79.2 males.

The median income for a household in the city was $45,784, and the median income for a family was $52,310. Males had a median income of $37,592 versus $25,369 for females. The per capita income for the city was $26,020. About 7.8% of families and 8.1% of the population were below the poverty line, including 8.5% of those under age 18 and 5.3% of those age 65 or over.

Big things small town

Casey is most known for its collection of "World's Largest" items.

Local craftsman and businessman, Jim Bolin, has built fourteen Guinness World record-qualifying things with Bolin Enterprises, Inc.:

 World's Largest Wind Chime
 World's Largest Golf Tee
 World's Largest Pitchfork
 World's Largest Rocking Chair
 World's Largest Wooden Shoes
 World's Largest Mailbox
 World's Largest Gavel (currently in Marshall, IL)
 World's Largest Truck Key
 World's Largest Barbershop Pole
 World's Largest Teeter Totter
 World's Largest Golf Driver
 World's Largest Swizzle Spoon

The other two have since been beaten: World’s Largest Knitting Needles and World’s Largest Crochet Hook.

Around the town, there are other big things that haven't gotten records like The Big Ear of Corn, The Big Mousetrap, and The Big Pizza Slicer (made by The Greathouse of Pizza), among others. Bolin has also created big things inspired by pop culture like the big PokeBall and big Minion.

Notable person

 David Hanners, 1989 Pulitzer Prize winner

See also
World's largest windchime

References

External links

 

Cities in Clark County, Illinois
Cities in Cumberland County, Illinois
Cities in Illinois
Charleston–Mattoon, IL Micropolitan Statistical Area